The Putnam City School District is a school district based in northwest Oklahoma City, Oklahoma suburb of Warr Acres, Oklahoma (United States). It serves approximately 40,000 students and includes 42 schools. It serves Warr Acres and parts of Bethany and northwest Oklahoma City.

The district was formed in 1917 through a consolidation multiple independent schools. Its name comes from the original name of one of the suburban developments that was incorporated to form Warr Acres.

History
The school district was the result of a consolidation of Central School, Ozmun School, Goff School, and County Line School. Classes were offered for grades 1 through 8 initially and were held in the I.M Putnam building at 40th and Grove, the former site of James L. Capps Middle School.

Warr Acres, where the district is located, incorporated several suburban developments including one called Putnam City. Putnam City was named for its developer, Israel M. Putnam, a state lawmaker and real estate developer.

List of schools
Putnam City Academy 
Putnam City High School
Putnam City North High School
Putnam City West High School
Cooper Middle School
Hefner Middle School
James L. Capps Middle School (previously, before it was named Central Middle School)
Mayfield Middle School
Western Oaks Middle School
Apollo Elementary School
Central Elementary School
Central Ies Elementary School(Usually Had A Central Intermediate)
Coronado Heights Elementary School
Dennis Elementary School
Harvest Hills Elementary School
Hilldale Elementary School
Kirkland Elementary School
Lake Park Elementary School
Northridge Elementary School
Overholser Elementary School
Ralph Downs Elementary School
Rollingwood Elementary School
Tulakes Elementary School
Western Oaks Elementary School
Wiley Post Elementary School
Will Rogers Elementary School
Windsor Hills Elementary School

References

External links

School districts in Oklahoma
Education in Oklahoma County, Oklahoma
School districts established in 1917